The 2010 Solomon Islands earthquake occurred with a moment magnitude of 7.1 on January 3 at 22:36:28 (UTC). The earthquake was the largest in a series of quakes to strike the Solomon Islands over the preceding days. The 7.1 mainshock was preceded by a 6.6 magnitude foreshock some 48 minutes previous. As many as 1,000 people were left homeless on the island of Rendova after the earthquake and tsunami destroyed approximately 200 homes.

Earthquake
The earthquake was centered under the sea floor near the town of Gizo, which was heavily damaged in the 2007 Solomon Islands earthquake.

Characteristic
Analysis of trench deformation, tsunami run-up heights and wave height data from the ocean revealed that the earthquake was a slow-rupturing "tsunami earthquake". Such earthquakes rupture the upper 20 km portion of a subduction zone, while releasing less energy compared to an ordinary subduction zone earthquake.

Effects

Landslides and tsunamis on the islands of Rendova and Tetepare. A tsunami measuring up to  struck Rendova, destroying as many as 200 homes and leaving one-third of Rendova's population homeless.

Approximately 1,000 residents have lost their residences, out of the total Rendovan population of just 3,600 people. The village of Retavo, which has a population of approximately 20 people, was hit by a 10-foot tsunami wave. Another village, Baniata, reported that sixteen homes were destroyed and thirty-two were damaged by the earthquake and tsunami.

See also
 2013 Solomon Islands earthquake
 List of earthquakes in 2010
 List of earthquakes in the Solomon Islands archipelago

References

Further reading

External links
 Quake Triggers Tsunami in Solomon Islands – Associated Press

2010 earthquakes
Earthquake
2010 Solomon
January 2010 events in Oceania
Tsunami earthquakes
2010 tsunamis